Strange Negotiations is David Bazan's second full-length studio album, released on 24 May 2011. Recording commenced in early November 2010 and was funded by pre-order purchases.

The album peaked at #32 on the Billboard Top Rock Album chart.

Track listing 
All songs written by David Bazan, except "Eating Paper" and "Messes" (words by David Bazan; music by Jason Martin and David Bazan).
"Wolves at the Door"
"Level with Yourself"
"Future Past"
"People"
"Virginia"
"Eating Paper"
"Messes"
"Don't Change"
"Strange Negotiations"
"Won't Let Go"

Reception 

The album was covered on NPR's All Things Considered. The A.V. Club gave the album a grade of "B," while Paste rated it at 8.4.

References

External links 
 Official Site

2011 albums
David Bazan albums
Barsuk Records albums